Route 878, or Highway 878, may refer to:

United States